James Madison High School is an elite public high school in the Midwood section of Brooklyn New York City. It serves students in grades 9 through 12 and is in Region 6 of the New York City Department of Education.

Established in 1925, the school has many famous graduates, among them the late United States Supreme Court Associate Justice Ruth Bader Ginsburg, Judge Judy Sheindlin, two sitting U.S. senators, Bernie Sanders (I-VT) and Chuck Schumer (D-NY), former Senator Norm Coleman (R-MN).

Academics
James Madison High School is organized in accordance with the house system. There are eight houses, each having a Teacher Coordinator, a Guidance Counselor, and an Assistant Principal assigned to supervise and assist students.

Special programs
Most students who apply to James Madison High School have the opportunity to apply to a specific "House". These include:
 Law Institute: Students develop an understanding of American legal institutions, and participate in activities such as moot courts and mock congressional hearings.
 Bio-Medical Institute: Students explore science through experimentation and hands-on experience in courses including AP Biology, Pathology, or AP Psychology.
 Math Academy: Students are given the opportunity to explore mathematics topics and to participate in math-related contests, events and trips.
 Liberal Arts House/AVID Academy: The Liberal Arts Academy offers a course of study in Humanities and Arts including project based studies in history, English, Literature, Creative Writing, Music and Theater.
 Information Technology House: Known informally as the I.T. House, it offers students the chance to take the Microsoft Word and Microsoft Excel certification exams for free, and engage with computer technology, programming and computer engineering.
 Academy of Finance: Students learn the basics of economics, finance and banking, and compare financial systems on both the macro and micro-scale.
 The International House (for students of limited English proficiency): A program for students whose primary language is not English, who get the opportunity to learn language and culture through immersion.
Madison Academy of Community and Civil Service: Students develop their literacy skills through community service projects such as "Cross-Age Tutoring" which matches them up with elementary school students who need help learning how to read.

Main campus 
James Madison High School is a six-floor red brick building with many rooms.
 Basement: The cafeteria is located in the building's basement.
 1st Floor: Main offices such as guidance and programming, main entrance to the theater, Music Department, library, swimming pool
 2nd Floor: English Department, Access to Gym 1. 
 3rd Floor: Science Department, IT House, Language Department, Teachers Cafeteria access to Gym 2. 
 4th Floor: Science Department, Math Department, Social Studies Department, Law Department.
 5th Floor: Science Department, Computer Repair Room, Art classes, Social Studies Department.
 6th Floor: Offices, Additional Classrooms, and Photography.
 Athletic fields: Football Field, Soccer Field, Baseball Field, Handball Courts, Tennis Courts, Track, Lacrosse Field, Roller Blading, and several more athletic facilities.

Academic Teams

Madison contains several teams which compete in academic competitions. These include Moot Court, Mock Trial, and We the People: The Citizen and the Constitution among various others. In May 2010, the James Madison High School Mock Trial team became the New York State Champions, while representing their region of New York City in Albany. The team competed against about 600 schools for first place. It was Madison's second time appearing in Albany after 5 years, and their first time winning. The school's team made it to the semi-finals in 2022. The school's Moot Court team also won the 2019 Mentor Moot Court City Championship and made it to the final round in 2020, losing to Brooklyn Technical High School. The We the People team won the 2020 and 2022 State Championships, ranking 26th in the nation. The Moot Court and Mock Trial teams accomplished their victories with the help of attorneys from Cadwalader, Wickersham & Taft.

Sports

Madison also offers a wide range of Boys And Girls PSAL Varsity and Junior Varsity Sports: Football, Soccer, Basketball, Track and field, Wrestling, Baseball, Softball, Tennis, Volleyball, Swimming, Cross Country, Handball, Cheerleading, and Lacrosse.

The James Madison Baseball Team is among the most successful in the school ranked fourth in the New York City PSAL and sixth including Catholic High Schools. The program has seen three of its players turn professional: Frank Torre, Cal Abrams and Harry Eisenstat. The Boys Varsity Volleyball team won the 2022 PSAL Division “A” championship. The Madison Wrestling Team has won many NYC Mayors Cup and City Champions, and has posted a winning record and made the playoffs 10 out of the last 12 seasons,

Full list of teams (as of 2017)

 Badminton Boys Varsity
 Badminton Girls Varsity
 Baseball Boys Jr. Varsity
 Baseball Boys Varsity
 Basketball Boys Jr. Varsity
 Basketball Boys Varsity
 Basketball Girls Jr. Varsity
 Basketball Girls Varsity
 Bowling Boys Varsity
 Cross Country Boys
 Cross Country Girls
 Flag Football Girls Varsity
 Football Boys Jr. Varsity
 Football Boys Varsity
 Girls Varsity Bowling
 Golf Co-Ed Varsity
 Golf Girls Varsity
 Handball Boys Varsity
 Handball Girls Varsity
 Indoor Track Boys
 Indoor Track Girls
 Lacrosse Boys Varsity
 Lacrosse Girls Varsity
 Outdoor Track Boys
 Outdoor Track Girls
 Rugby Boys Varsity
 Soccer Boys Varsity
 Soccer Girls Varsity
 Softball Girls Jr. Varsity
 Softball Girls Varsity
 Stunt Co-Ed Varsity
 Swimming Boys Varsity
 Swimming Girls Varsity
 Table Tennis Boys Varsity
 Table Tennis Girls Varsity
 Tennis Boys Varsity
 Tennis Girls Varsity
 Volleyball Boys Varsity
 Volleyball Girls Jr. Varsity
 Volleyball Girls Varsity
 Wrestling Boys Varsity
 Wrestling Girls Varsity

SING!
SING!, a musical competition between the grades, has been a Madison tradition for over 50 years. On November 15, 2008, the Senior/Sophomore team lost to the Junior/Freshman team for the first time in 6 years, on the 60th anniversary of SING!. A competition called Brooklyn SINGS, also known as "InterSING", started in 2014. InterSING is a competition between Madison, Midwood, & Murrow High Schools to see who has the best SING performance. The winning team at Madison, Midwood, & Murrow will advance on to InterSING. In 2014–2015, InterSING took place in the Joseph Anzalone Theater in Edward R. Murrow High School in Midwood, Brooklyn. InterSING is a fundraiser for the American Cancer Society.

Teachers
 William Frauenglass
 Clarence Taylor

Alumni
Notable alumni of James Madison High School include:

 Cal Abrams (1924-1997, class of 1942), Major-League Baseball player.
 Maury Allen (born Maurice Allen Rosenberg; 1932–2010, class of 1949), sportswriter. 
 Roger Andewelt (1946-2001, class of 1963), attorney, federal judge US Court of Federal Claims
 Arthur Ashkin (1922–2020, class of 1940), Nobel Prize winner, physics.
 Julius Ashkin (1920-1982, class of 1936), Manhattan Project physicist.
 Gary Becker (1930-2014, class of 1948), Nobel Prize winner, economics.
 Paul Bender, attorney, author, judge, law professor, and former Dean of the Arizona State University College of Law.
 Mimi Benzell (1918-1970), opera singer.
 Walter Block (born 1941, class of 1959), Austrian School economist, anarcho-capitalist theoretician, professor of economics
 Harry Boatswain (1969-2005, class of 1987), former professional NFL football player.
 Andrew Dice Clay (born 1957 as Andrew Clay Silverstein), comedian.
 Stanley Cohen (1922–2020, class of 1939), Nobel Prize winner, medicine.
 Norm Coleman (born 1949, class of 1966), former US Senator (Republican of Minnesota).
 Paul Contillo (Born July 8, 1929, New Jersey State Senator)
 Robert Dallek (born 1934, class of 1952), historian.
 Roy DeMeo (1942-1983, class of 1959), mobster.
 Harry Eisenstat (1915-2003, class of 1935), Major League Baseball player
 Devale Ellis (born 1984), professional football player.
 Harvey Feldman (born 1931, class of 1949) US Diplomat: known for planning the 1972 Nixon trip to China, US Ambassador to Papua New Guinea and the Solomon Islands, Alternative US Representative to the United Nations
 Sandra Feldman (1939-2005, class of 1956), President of the American Federation of Teachers.
 Stan Fields (born 1955, class of 1973) US biologist: discovered the two-hybrid system
 Norman Finkelstein (born 1953) political scientist, activist, professor, author.
 Sonny Fox (born 1925), TV personality.
 Kevin Francis, class of 2011 CFL player
Fran Fraschilla (born 1958, class of 1976), American basketball commentator and former college basketball coach 
 Leonard Frey (1938-1988, class of 1956), actor.
 Joseph S. Fruton (1912–2007), born Joseph Fruchtgarten, Jewish Polish-American biochemist and historian of science.
 David Frye (1933-2011; born David Shapiro), comedian.
 Sid Ganis (born 1940, class of 1957), motion picture executive.
 William Gaines (1922-1992, class of 1939), founding publisher of Mad magazine.
 Ruth Bader Ginsburg (1933–2020, class of 1950), Associate Justice, US Supreme Court.
 Richard D. Gitlin (born 1943, class of 1959) – National Academy of Engineering, co-invention of DSL Bell Labs
Lila R. Gleitman (1929–2021), 2017 Rumelhart prize recipient
 Marty Glickman (1917-2001, class of 1935), Olympian and broadcaster.
 Ron Haigler (born 1953, class of 1971), basketball player.
 Stanley Myron Handleman (1929-2007, class of 1947), comedian.
 Deborah Hay (born 1941, class of 1957), Dancer, artist
 Ellis Horowitz (born 1944, class of 1960), computer scientist, professor
 Garson Kanin (1912-1999, class of 1927), writer and director of plays and films.
 Stanley Kaplan (1919-2009, class of 1935), test preparation entrepreneur.
 Buddy Kaye (1918-2002), songwriter, musician, producer, author and publisher.
 Donald Keene (1922-2019, class of 1939), Japanese scholar, historian, writer, and translator.
 Carole King (born 1942 as Carole Klein, class of 1958), singer and songwriter.
 Paul L. Krinsky (born 1928, class of 1946), U.S. Navy rear admiral.
 Martin Landau (1928-2017), Academy Award-winning actor.
 Rudy LaRusso (1937–2004), five-time All-Star NBA basketball player.
 Mell Lazarus (1927-2016), cartoonist.
 Andrew Levane (1920-2012, class of 1940), professional basketball player.
 David Lichtenstein (born 1960), billionaire real estate investor
 Elaine Malbin (born 1932, class of 1948), opera singer.
 Marvin Miller (1917-2012, class of 1933), MLB players union executive director.
 Bruce Morrow (born 1935, class of 1953), radio personality.
 Herbert S. Okun (1930-2011, class of 1947), diplomat.
 Martin Lewis Perl (1927-2014, class of 1942), Nobel Prize winner, physics.
 Sylvia Porter (1913-1991, class of 1930), economist and journalist.
 Deborah Poritz (born 1936, class of 1954), N.J. Attorney General then Chief Justice, N.J. Supreme Court.
Shais Rishon (born 1982, class of 1999), rabbi, activist, and writer.
 Chris Rock (born 1965), comedian and actor.
 Norman Rosten (1913-1995), poet, playwright and novelist.
 Dmitry Salita (born 1982), professional boxer.
 Murray Saltzman (1929–2010, class of 1947), Reform Jewish rabbi.
 Bernie Sanders (born 1941, class of 1959), US Senator, (Independent of Vermont) as well as a 2016 and 2020 U.S. presidential candidate.
 Larry Sanders (born 1935), British politician and brother of Bernie Sanders.
 Babe Scheuer (1913–1997), American football player
 Harvey Schlesinger (born 1940, class of 1958), US District Judge for the Middle District of Florida
 Ted Schreiber (born 1938), Major League Baseball player.
 Chuck Schumer (born 1950, class of 1967), U.S. Senate Majority Leader (New York)
 Irwin Shaw (born Irwin Gilbert Shamforoff; 1913–1984, class of 1929), playwright, screenwriter and novelist.
 Judith Sheindlin (born 1942, class of 1960), television personality (Judge Judy).
 Janis Siegel (born 1952, class of 1969), vocalist for Manhattan Transfer and winner of ten Grammys.
 Barry Simon (born 1946, class of 1962), IBM Professor of Mathematics and Theoretical Physics at Caltech.
 Robert Solow (born 1924, class of 1940), Nobel Prize winner, economics.
 Irving Terjesen (1915–1990, class of 1934), All-American college basketball player for NYU and early professional.
 Frank Torre (1931-2014, class of 1950), professional baseball player.
 Sidney Verba (born 1932), political scientist.
 Stephen Verona (1940-2019) filmmaker.
 David Wohl (born 1954, class of 1971) television and film character actor.
 Larry Zicklin (born 1936), Neuberger & Berman Chairman of the Board
 Joel Zwick (born 1942, class of 1958), film, television and theater director.

References

External links
 James Madison High School
 James Madison High School Jewish Culture Club

Educational institutions established in 1925
Public high schools in Brooklyn
Sheepshead Bay, Brooklyn
1925 establishments in New York City